Michael Inniss (born 15 January 1965) is a Barbadian cricketer. He played in one List A and four first-class matches for the Barbados cricket team from 1985 to 1989.

See also
 List of Barbadian representative cricketers

References

External links
 

1965 births
Living people
Barbadian cricketers
Barbados cricketers
People from Saint Michael, Barbados